Mary Stuart (German: Maria Stuart) is a 1927 German silent historical film directed by Friedrich Feher and Leopold Jessner and starring Magda Sonja, Fritz Kortner and Walter Janssen. It portrays the reign of Mary, Queen of Scots. It was shot at the Staaken Studios in Berlin. The film's sets were designed by the art director Robert A. Dietrich. It was made by the production company National Film and released in two parts.

Cast
 Magda Sonja as Mary, Queen of Scots  
 Fritz Kortner as Marschall Bothwell  
 Walter Janssen as Lord Darnley  
 Anton Pointner as Graf Leicester  
 Franz Blei as John Knox  
 Anton Kuh as Dr. Marias  
 Arthur Kraußneck as Norfolk Vater  
 Eberhard Leithoff as Norfolk Sohn  
 Martin Herzberg as Der Page  
 Heinrich Witte as Der erste Soldat  
 Erich Dunskus as Der zweite Soldat

References

Bibliography
 Parrill, Sue & Robison, William B. The Tudors on Film and Television. McFarland, 2013.

External links

1927 films
Films of the Weimar Republic
Films directed by Friedrich Feher
Films directed by Leopold Jessner
German silent feature films
Films set in the 16th century
Films set in Scotland
German historical films
1920s historical films
National Film films
German black-and-white films
Films released in separate parts
Films shot at Staaken Studios
1920s German films